Live @ the Vision Festival is an album by American jazz trombonist Steve Swell, which was recorded at the 2006 Vision Festival and released on the Polish Not Two label. It was the third release by Slammin' the Infinite, this time a quintet with guest pianist John Blum.

Reception

In his review for AllMusic, Michael G. Nastos states "Swell and his quintet dubbed 'Slammin' the Infinite' do indeed push the envelope, play arresting free-based music, and decompose standard jazz nomenclature while also paying tribute to the pioneering heroes of the genre."

The Penguin Guide to Jazz says "'Three large slabs the sound give the disc an undifferentiated feel, though the closing threnody for Frank Lowe suddenly seems to acquire coherence."

In a double review for All About Jazz, John Sharpe notes that "Less than perfect sound is the only drawback to an otherwise splendid disc... But the passion, power and high octane exuberance of this band nonetheless makes for required listening."

Track listing
All compositions by Steve Swell
"Improv / Box Set" - 16:11
"For Grachan" - 15:37
"Patient Explorer / For Frank Lowe" - 14:55

Personnel
Steve Swell - trombone
Sabir Mateen - alto sax, tenor sax, clarinet, flute
Matthew Heyner - bass
Klaus Kugel  - drums
John Blum  - piano

References

2007 live albums
Steve Swell live albums
Albums recorded at the Vision Festival